World Coffee Research (WCR) is a non-profit research and development agricultural organization. The organization was founded with participation or funds from thirty coffee industry groups including the Specialty Coffee Association of America, Green Mountain Coffee Roasters, Peet's Coffee & Tea, Counter Culture Coffee, the coffee importers InterAmerican Coffee, and specialty coffee providers Coffee Bean International.

The current CEO is Vern Long, a plant breeder who formerly served as director of the Office of Agricultural Research & Policy at the U.S. Agency for International Development (USAID).  WCR was founded by plant geneticist Dr. Timothy Schilling. WCR uses research in coffee genetics and agronomy to create new varieties, and advises farmers, among others with respect to the threat of climate change.

WCR collaborates with local research institutions, coffee organizations, governments, and NGOs to carry out a common research agenda.  They also partner with the private sector to aid the uptake of agricultural innovations through the coffee supply chain. Between 2012 and 2018, WCR says it collaborated with 81 partners, including 33 government institutes and research organizations.

References

Agricultural organizations based in the United States
Non-profit organizations based in Texas
Agricultural research
Coffee organizations
Coffee in the United States